Frederick Frank Kaftan (August 25, 1916 – November 9, 2001) was a member of the Wisconsin State Senate.

He was born in Green Bay, Wisconsin. He graduated from the University of Wisconsin Law School. From 1944 to 1946 he served in the Navy. He died on November 9, 2001.

Career
Kaftan served as a Senate Senator for the 2nd from 1949 to 1952. He was a Republican. He quit politics in 1952 to focus on his professional legal practice.

References

Politicians from Green Bay, Wisconsin
University of Wisconsin Law School alumni
Republican Party Wisconsin state senators
1916 births
2001 deaths
20th-century American politicians